The 1989 Liège–Bastogne–Liège was the 75th edition of the Liège–Bastogne–Liège cycle race and was held on 16 April 1989. The race started and finished in Liège. The race was won by Sean Kelly of the PDM team.

General classification

References

1989
1989 in Belgian sport
1989 UCI Road World Cup
1989 in road cycling
April 1989 sports events in Europe